In the 2019 FIFA Women's World Cup qualification process, one spot in the final tournament was allocated to the winner of a two-legged home-and-away play-off between the fourth-placed team from CONCACAF (Panama) and the third-placed team from CONMEBOL (Argentina).

Qualified teams

Summary
The draw for the order of legs was held on 9 June 2018 in Zürich during a meeting between the secretary generals of CONCACAF and CONMEBOL. Argentina were drawn to host the first leg, while Panama (the identity of the team from CONCACAF was not known at time of draw) were drawn to host the second leg.

The matches took place on 8 and 13 November 2018, during the women's international match calendar period.

|}

Matches

Argentina won 5–1 on aggregate and qualified for the 2019 FIFA Women's World Cup.

Goalscorers

References

External links
FIFA website

Play-off
Argentina at the 2019 FIFA Women's World Cup
Argentina women's national football team matches
Panama women's national football team matches
November 2018 sports events in North America
November 2018 sports events in South America
2018 in Argentine football
2018 in Argentine women's sport
2019
2019